The Retreat ceremony (lowering of the flags ceremony) at Mahavir/Sadqi international parade ground in Fazilka, like Wagah border ceremony and Hussainiwala National Martyrs Memorial, is a daily retreat ceremony ritual in which the security forces of India (Border Security Force) and Pakistan (Pakistan Rangers) are performing daily joint ceremonial drill. 

It is alternatively a symbol of the two countries' rivalry, as well as brotherhood and cooperation.

Overview 

It is on the former national highway no. 10 and about 14 km from the District’s headquarters, Fazilka.

See also
 Borders of India
 Look-East Connectivity projects
 Look East policy (India)

References

Stadiums in Pakistan
India–Pakistan relations